Fernando de la Mora (born 1958) is a Mexican operatic tenor. He began his music education in the National Conservatory of Mexico and studied with Leticia Velázquez and Rosa Rimoch.

He made his debut in Jalapa with Madama Butterfly in 1986, later in the Metropolitan Opera House in New York, San Francisco, Los Angeles, Houston, Miami, San Diego, La Scala in Milan, Vienna State Opera, Opéra Bastille of Paris, Covent Garden of London and many others.

He has worked with conductors like Zubin Mehta, Riccardo Muti, Lorin Maazel, Charles Mackerras, Eduardo Mata, and Richard Bonynge.

He mainly sings Italian and French opera. He has more than 20 recordings, most of them on Telarc.

Repertoire
 Lord Percy - Anna Bolena
 Don José - Carmen
 Faust - Faust
 Rodolfo - La Bohème 
 Alfredo - La Traviata
 Gerald - Lakmé 
 Hoffman - Les contes d'Hoffman
 Edgardo - Lucia di Lammermoor
 Macduff - Macbeth
 Pinkerton - Madama Butterfly
 Chevalier des Grieux - "Manon"
 the Duke of Mantua - Rigoletto
 Roberto Devereux - Roberto Devereux 
 Roméo - Roméo et Juliette 
 Mario Cavaradossi - Tosca
 Werther - Werther

Sources
Cummings, D. (ed,), "de la Mora, Fernando", International Who's Who in Classical Music, Routledge, 2003,  pp. 180–181. 

1958 births
Living people
Mexican operatic tenors
20th-century Mexican male opera singers
21st-century Mexican male opera singers
Singers from Mexico City